Longyang District is a district of the city of Baoshan, Yunnan province, China.

Administrative divisions
Longyang District has 6 subdistricts, 5 towns, 6 townships and 4 ethnic townships. 
6 subdistricts

5 towns

6 townships

4 ethnic townships

Ethnic groups
The Yaojing , a subgroup of the De'ang, are located in Baizhai , Laxian , and Dagoubian  of Mangyan Village  and Shiti Village  in Lujiang Township , Longyang District (Baoshan Ethnic Gazetteer 2006:490-491).

Mineral resources
 'Chlorite group'
 Cinnabar
 Dolomite
 Galena
 Pyrite
 Pyrrhotite
 Sphalerite

References

External links
 Longyang District Official Website
 Longyang Tourism Bureau

County-level divisions of Baoshan, Yunnan